Lieutenant-Colonel George Johnston (19 March 1764 – 5 January 1823) was a British military officer who served as Lieutenant-Governor of New South Wales, Australia after leading the rebellion later known as the Rum Rebellion. After serving as a young marine officer in the American Revolutionary War, Johnston served in the East Indies, fighting against the French, before volunteering to accompany the First Fleet to New South Wales. After serving as adjutant to Governor Arthur Phillip, Johnston served in the New South Wales Corps and he was a key figure in putting down the Castle Hill convict rebellion in 1804. He led his troops in deposing Governor Bligh in the Rum Rebellion in 1808; which led to his court martial and subsequent cashiering from military service. In his later life, he returned to New South Wales as a private citizen, raising a family in the colony and establishing a successful farm around Annandale in Sydney.

Early life and military career
Johnston was born on 19 March 1764 at Annan, Dumfriesshire, Scotland, the son of Captain George Johnston, aide-de-camp to Lord Percy, later the 2nd Duke of Northumberland. Percy obtained a commission for the 12-year-old Johnston as second lieutenant of marines on 6 March 1776. Johnston went to America with his regiment, and took part in the American Revolutionary War, serving in New York and Halifax during 1777 and 1778, after which he was promoted to first lieutenant. During the campaign, his father was killed. The Duke of Northumberland, who had held Johnston's father in high regard, became Johnston's guardian.

The young officer subsequently acted as a recruiting officer in the United Kingdom before serving aboard  in the East Indies in 1781, and suffering a severe wound in action against the French. Returned to garrison duty in Portsmouth, he volunteered to join the New South Wales Marine Corps, which would accompany the First Fleet to New South Wales. He sailed for Australia aboard the convict transport Lady Penrhyn in 1788.

New South Wales
On arrival in New South Wales, Johnston served as adjutant to Governor Arthur Phillip, and was promoted in 1789 to the rank of Captain-Lieutenant of Marines. He transferred from the New South Wales Marine Corps to the locally raised New South Wales Corps in 1791 with the rank of captain.

Johnston received extensive land grants in areas of modern Petersham, Bankstown and Cabramatta. Johnston's other grants included land which is now the suburb of Annandale, named for his property that was in turn named after the place of his birth. He and Esther Abrahams farmed and lived on Annandale with their children.

In September 1796, Johnston was appointed aide-de-camp to Governor John Hunter, and in 1800 received his brevet rank as major. In the same year Johnston was put under arrest by Lieutenant Governor William Paterson on charges of "paying spirits to a sergeant as part of his pay—and disobedience of orders". Johnston objected to trial by court-martial in the colony, and Hunter sent him to England. There the difficulties of conducting a trial with witnesses in Australia led to the proceedings being dropped, and Johnston returned to New South Wales in 1802. In 1803 Johnston took temporary command of the New South Wales Corps during the illness of Paterson, and became involved in the conflict between King and the military. In March 1804 he acted with decision when in command of the military sent against some convicts who had rebelled at Castle Hill. When Paterson was sent to Port Dalrymple, Johnston became commander of the New South Wales Corps.

On 26 January 1808, Johnston played a key role in the only successful armed takeover of a government in Australia's recorded history, the Rum Rebellion, working closely with John Macarthur. Johnston led the troops that deposed Governor William Bligh, assumed the title of lieutenant-governor, and illegally suspended the judge-advocate and other officials. The administration of justice became farcical, and there were signs of strong discontent among the settlers.

Johnston was promoted to the rank of lieutenant-colonel on 25 April 1808, and was superseded by his senior officer Joseph Foveaux, who was Lieutenant-Governor of Norfolk Island, on 28 July. Johnston sailed for England with John Macarthur in March 1809 (and Henry Fulton as a witness) and was tried by court-martial in May 1811. Found guilty of mutiny he was sentenced to be cashiered. This lenience of the sentence imposed in the circumstances presumably indicates that the court was convinced that he had been the tool of other people.

Later life

Johnston returned to New South Wales in May 1813 as a private individual and in November the following year at St John's Church in Parramatta he married Esther Abrahams, a Jewish convict whom he had met on the transport Lady Penrhyn in 1787. The couple had already had seven children together by that time, and they lived on his land at Annandale Farm, Sydney. He died much respected on 5 January 1823, leaving a large family. He was first interred in a private mausoleum on his Annandale property, until its subdivision to become an inner-city suburb. His remains were moved to a new mausoleum at Waverley Cemetery in 1904.

The suburb of Georges Hall is named after the farmhouse of the same name on land grants Johnston received near the junction of the Georges River and Prospect Creek. This building still exists, and is now one of Australia's oldest houses. Johnston and Esther Abrahams and their children farmed and lived on Annandale until the 1870s, when the property was sold and sub-divided for residential development. The main street of Annandale is named after Johnston, and the gates of their property now stand in the grounds of Annandale Public School.

Notes

References

Further reading

External links
 George's Hall, Major Johnston's Bankstown Estate
 

1764 births
1823 deaths
Royal Marines officers
Lieutenant-Governors of New South Wales
Scottish emigrants to colonial Australia
People from Annan, Dumfries and Galloway
British Army personnel who were court-martialled
Burials at Waverley Cemetery
Royal Navy personnel of the American Revolutionary War
First Fleet
Leaders who took power by coup